Ronald Smith (16 February 1926 – 3 March 2001) was an English cricketer.  Smith was a right-handed batsman who bowled right-arm fast-medium.  He was born in Dudley, Worcestershire.

Smith made a single first-class appearance for Northamptonshire against Surrey in the 1954 County Championship.  In this match he took a single wicket, that of David Fletcher for the cost of 38 runs from 17 overs.  With the bat he was dismissed for a duck in Northamptonshire's first-innings be Tony Lock, while in their second-innings he ended unbeaten on 19.

He died in Worcester, Worcestershire on 3 March 2001

References

External links
Ronald Smith at ESPNcricinfo
Ronald Smith at CricketArchive

1926 births
2001 deaths
Sportspeople from Dudley
English cricketers
Northamptonshire cricketers